The Mohn Peaks are two ice-covered peaks, the northern and southern being  high, respectively, standing  west-southwest of the head of Mason Inlet, on the east coast of Palmer Land, Antarctica. They were first seen and photographed from the air in December 1940 by the United States Antarctic Service. During 1947 the peaks were photographed from the air by the Ronne Antarctic Research Expedition under Finn Ronne, who in conjunction with the Falkland Islands Dependencies Survey (FIDS) charted them from the ground. They were named by the FIDS for Norwegian meteorologist Henrik Mohn.

References

Mountains of Palmer Land